John Stuart (June 24, 1830 – September 15, 1913) was a Scottish-born wholesale grocer and political figure in Ontario. He represented Norfolk South in the House of Commons of Canada in 1874 as a Liberal member.

He was born in Keith, Banffshire, the son of James Stuart. He was educated there, worked as a clerk in a lawyer's office and came to Canada West in 1848, settling first in Toronto and then Hamilton in 1864. In 1856, he married Jane Jacques. In 1864, he established a wholesale grocery business in partnership with Alexander Harvey, the husband of his sister Margaret. Stuart was elected in the 1874 federal election; his election was overturned after an appeal and he was defeated by William Wallace in the by-election held in December 1874. Stuart was also vice-president of the Bank of Hamilton and a director of the Wellington, Bruce and Grey Railway. He also served as president of the Hamilton and North-Western Railway. Stuart died in Toronto at the age of 83.

References 
 
The Canadian parliamentary companion HJ Morgan (1874)

1830 births
1913 deaths
Members of the House of Commons of Canada from Ontario
Liberal Party of Canada MPs
People from Keith, Moray